Jens Odgaard (born 31 March 1999) is a Danish professional footballer who plays as a striker for Dutch club AZ.

Youth career
Odgaard is a youth exponent from Lyngby Boldklub.

Club career

Lyngby Boldklub
Odgaard got his debut for Lyngby BK on 15 March 2016 at the age of just 16. He started on the bench, but replaced Gustav Therkildsen in the 89th minute in a 1–0 victory against Aalborg in the Danish Cup.

He played his first league game on 17 April 2016, where he came on the pitch in the 65th minute, replacing Jeppe Kjær, in a 2–0 victory against Næstved BK.

Odgaard extended his contract with Lyngby in the summer 2016 until the summer 2018, and was moved up to the senior squad. He was the youngest player ever for Lyngby Boldklub, to have played a match in the Danish Superliga, at the age of 17 years and 115 days.

Inter
On 5 July 2017, Inter Milan announced the signing of Odgaard. He played for the youth team.

Sassuolo
On 30 June 2018, Odgaard was transferred to Serie A team Sassuolo, however Inter Milan reserved the right to buy him back.

Heerenveen (loan)
On 22 June 2019, Odgaard joined to Eredivisie club SC Heerenveen on loan until 30 June 2020.

Lugano (loan)
On 2 October 2020, Odgaard joined Swiss club Lugano on loan until 30 June 2021.

Pescara (loan) 
On 22 January 2021, Odgaard joined Serie B club Pescara, on a loan until the end of the season.

RKC Waalwijk (loan)
On 24 July 2021, he moved to RKC Waalwijk in the Netherlands on a new loan.

AZ
On 24 June 2022, Odgaard moved to Dutch club AZ and signed a five-year contract.

References

External links
 
 Jens Odgaard at Lyngbys website
 Jens Odgaard at DBU

Living people
1999 births
Association football forwards
Danish men's footballers
Denmark under-21 international footballers
Denmark youth international footballers
Danish Superliga players
Serie A players
Eredivisie players
Serie B players
Lyngby Boldklub players
U.S. Sassuolo Calcio players
SC Heerenveen players
FC Lugano players
Delfino Pescara 1936 players
RKC Waalwijk players
AZ Alkmaar players
Danish expatriate men's footballers
Danish expatriates in Italy
Danish expatriates in the Netherlands
Expatriate footballers in Italy
Expatriate footballers in the Netherlands
Expatriate footballers in Switzerland
Danish expatriate sportspeople in the Netherlands
Danish expatriate sportspeople in Italy
Danish expatriate sportspeople in Switzerland
People from Hillerød Municipality
Sportspeople from the Capital Region of Denmark